The 1970 NAIA men's basketball tournament was held in March at Municipal Auditorium in Kansas City, Missouri. The 33rd annual NAIA basketball tournament featured 32 teams playing in a single-elimination format.

Kentucky State would win the first of three straight National Championship titles, becoming the second team to win three in a row, and the third team to win three titles. 

The 3rd-place game would go into overtime for second time in tournament history. The 6th seeded Eastern New Mexico State Greyhounds beat the 8th seeded Guilford Quakers 77-72 in one overtime.

Awards and honors
Leading scorer: Travis Grant, Kentucky State; 5 games, 57 field goals, 23 free throws, 137 total points (27.4 average points per game)
Leading rebounder: Elmore Smith, Kentucky State & Greg Hyder, Eastern New Mexico; 5 games, 65 rebounds, (13 average rebounds per game)
Player of the Year: est. 1994
Most field goals made; career; 223; Travis Grant, Kentucky State, (1970, 71, 72)
Most career points; individual: 518, Travis Grant, Kentucky State, (1970, 71, 72)
All-time leading scorer; first appearance: Travis Grant, 1st (1970, 71, 72) 15 games, 223 field goals, 72 free throws, 518 points (34.5 average points per game)

1970 NAIA bracket

  * denotes overtime.

Third-place game
The third-place game featured the losing teams from the national semifinalist to determine 3rd and 4th places in the tournament. This game was played until 1988.

See also
 1970 NCAA University Division basketball tournament
 1970 NCAA College Division basketball tournament

References

NAIA Men's Basketball Championship
Tournament
NAIA men's basketball tournament
NAIA men's basketball tournament
College basketball tournaments in Missouri
Basketball competitions in Kansas City, Missouri